Frank Rowbotham Foster (31 January 1889 – 3 May 1958) was an English amateur cricketer who played for Warwickshire County Cricket Club from 1908 to 1914, and in Test cricket for England in 1911 and 1912. He was born in Birmingham and died in Northampton. His career was cut short after a motor-cycle accident during World War I.

Foster was an all-rounder. As a right-handed batsman, he scored 6,548 career runs in 159 first-class matches at an average of 26.61 runs per completed innings with a highest score of 305* as one of seven centuries. He was a left-arm fast medium bowler and took 717 first-class wickets with a best return of 9/118. He took five wickets in an innings 53 times and ten wickets in a match 8 times with a best return of 12/92. As a fielder, Foster completed 121 catches.

References

External links
 

1889 births
1958 deaths
Cricketers who have taken five wickets on Test debut
England Test cricketers
English cricketers
Gentlemen cricketers
Lord Londesborough's XI cricketers
Marylebone Cricket Club Australian Touring Team cricketers
Marylebone Cricket Club cricketers
People educated at Solihull School
Warwickshire cricket captains
Warwickshire cricketers
Wisden Cricketers of the Year